Kim Won-kwon (born 13 December 1918), also romanized as Kim Won-gwon, is a Korean former long jumper and triple jumper. Kim was the world's leading triple jumper during the early 1940s and competed in the 1948 Summer Olympics.

Career

Like other Korean athletes of the time, Kim represented Japan while it ruled Korea, winning gold in men's triple jump at the 1939 Vienna International University Games with a jump of 15.37 m. He topped the triple jump world list in 1938 (15.63 m), 1940 (15.68 m), 1941 (15.82 m), 1942 (15.64 m) and 1943 (15.86 m); the last of these marks was his personal best and remained the South Korean record for more than forty years. In 1939 it was reported that Kim had jumped 16.25 m in training, which would have been a world record if duplicated in an official meeting.

Kim was also a good long jumper, and would have been a leading favorite in both events at the 1940 Summer Olympics if they had not been cancelled due to World War II. Kim represented South Korea at the 1948 Olympics, but by then he had lost his best shape; he placed 18th in the long jump and 12th in the triple jump.

References

External links

  

1918 births
Possibly living people
South Korean male triple jumpers
South Korean male long jumpers
Japanese male triple jumpers
Japanese male long jumpers
Athletes (track and field) at the 1948 Summer Olympics
Olympic athletes of South Korea